Currency Creek wine region is a wine region in South Australia that is located on the west side of Lake Alexandrina between Milang, the Murray Mouth, Port Elliot and just south of Ashbourne.

Extent and appellation
The Currency Creek wine region is one of five wine zones forming the Fleurieu zone which located to the immediate south of Adelaide city centre in South Australia.  The Currency Creek wine region extends from Milang on the shore of Lake Alexandrina in the north east, to the Murray Mouth in the south east, Port Elliot in the south west and just south of Ashbourne in the north west.  The wine region includes vineyards on Hindmarsh Island.  
The term ‘Currency Creek’ was registered as an AGI on 9 April 2001.

Grapes and wine
Alternatively, red wine varietals account for of plantings while white wines varietals account for of plantings.
As of 2014, the region is reported as having four wineries.

See also

South Australian wine

Citations and references

Citations

References

External links
Currency Creek Wine Region Association website
Currency Creek Wine Region South Australian Tourism Bureau homepage

Wine regions of South Australia